Kinnison is a surname. Notable people with the name include:

 Kimball Kinnison, fictional hero of E.E. Smith's Lensmen series of novels
 Terry Kinnison, a neighbor involved in the history of the 1992 siege at Ruby Ridge, Idaho  
 William A. Kinnison, past president of Wittenberg University, Ohio